Piadena Drizzona is a comune (municipality) in the Province of Cremona in the Italian region Lombardy.

It was established on 1 January 2019 by the merger of the municipalities of Piadena and Drizzona.

References

Cities and towns in Lombardy
Populated places established in 2019
2010 establishments in Italy